Denver railway station (originally opened as Denver Road Gate) was a station in Denver, Norfolk on the Great Eastern Railway route between King's Lynn and Cambridge, commonly known as the Fen Line. It was also the beginning of a small branch to Stoke Ferry.

History
Two months later, on New Years Day 1847, the Lynn & Ely Railway was extended to Denver Road Gate Station. The station was opened with the line to Ely. It closed on 1 February 1870, re-opened on 1 July 1885, and finally closed on 22 September 1930.

Routes

Notes

References

External links 

Former Great Eastern Railway stations
Disused railway stations in Norfolk
Railway stations in Great Britain opened in 1847
Railway stations in Great Britain closed in 1870
Railway stations in Great Britain opened in 1885
Railway stations in Great Britain closed in 1930
1847 establishments in England